Brendan Michael Smyth (born 27 July 1959) is a former Australian politician, who was a member of the Australian Capital Territory Legislative Assembly representing the electorate of Brindabella for the Liberal Party from 1998 until 2016. From 2002 to 2006 Smyth was the ACT Leader of the Opposition and served briefly as the Deputy Chief Minister during 2000 and 2001. He has held the ACT portfolios Urban Services, Business, Tourism and the Arts, and Police and Emergency Services.

Prior to his election to the ACT Legislative Assembly he served briefly as the Member for Canberra in the Australian House of Representatives, also representing the Liberals.

Career
Smyth was born in Sydney and moved to Canberra in May 1969. He worked at the National Library of Australia until 1995 when, representing the Liberal Party, he contested the 1995 by-election for the House of Representatives seat of Canberra. Normally a safe Labor seat, its previous member Ros Kelly had left under a cloud, having been forced to resign her ministry a year earlier over the sports rorts affair, and Smyth received a 16.1% swing to claim the seat.

At the Australian federal election on 2 March 1996, Smyth contested the new federal House of Representatives seat of Namadgi, essentially the southern portion of his old seat, even though it had been drawn with a notional Labor majority of 10.9 percent.  He was defeated by Labor's Annette Ellis.  , he is the last non-Labor member to represent an ACT-based seat.

He subsequently shifted to territory politics, winning election to the Legislative Assembly in the 1998 election representing the Tuggeranong-based multimember electorate of Brindabella. He was the Opposition Leader for the ACT Liberal Party in the 2004 ACT elections, but lost the election.

Smyth resigned from the ACT Legislative Assembly on 15 July 2016, to take up a newly created government position as Commissioner for International Engagement for the ACT. The ensuing casual vacancy was filled by conducting a countback of votes at the 2012 ACT election.

See also

 Humphries Ministry

References

External links
 Canberra Liberals People: Brendan Smyth

1959 births
Living people
Deputy Chief Ministers of the Australian Capital Territory
Liberal Party of Australia members of the Australian Capital Territory Legislative Assembly
Liberal Party of Australia members of the Parliament of Australia
Members of the Australian House of Representatives
Members of the Australian House of Representatives for Canberra
Members of the Australian Capital Territory Legislative Assembly
Leaders of the Opposition in the Australian Capital Territory
People from Canberra
21st-century Australian politicians
20th-century Australian politicians